Reynolds Technology is a manufacturer of tubing for bicycle frames and other bicycle components based in Birmingham, England established in 1898.

History

The Reynolds Tube Company was founded in 1898 by John Reynolds in Birmingham, England, but traces its origins back to 1841 when John Reynolds set up a company manufacturing nails. In 1897, the company patented the process for making butted tubes, which are thicker at the ends than in the middle, this allowed frame builders to create frames that were both strong and lightweight. Reynolds introduced the double-butted tube-set 531 in 1934.

The Patent Butted Tube Co., Ltd., the predecessor of the present company, was spun off from John Reynolds' original company in 1898.  In 1923 the Patent Butted Tube Co., Ltd changed its name to Reynolds Tube Co., Ltd. and retained this name up until 1928 when it was acquired by Tube Investments, Ltd and became TI Reynolds 531 Ltd.

In 1996 Coyote Sports Inc., a privately held company based in Boulder, Colorado acquired TI Reynolds 531 Ltd. resulting in a name change to Reynolds Cycle Technology Ltd.  In 2006 the company underwent another name change to Reynolds Technology Ltd., reflecting the increasing revenues from diversification into "new" sectors for tubing outside the cycle industry.

When Coyote Sports entered Chapter 11 reorganization, a management buy-out resulted in the company returning to its base in the UK.

Cycle tubing development

Reynolds has over the years developed a number of steel alloys, most notably Reynolds 531, which has a high strength and can be made into strong, but lightweight tubes for bicycle frames. Before the introduction of more exotic materials such as aluminium, titanium or composites, Reynolds was considered the dominant maker of high end materials for bicycle frames, with 27 winners of the Tour de France winning the race riding on Reynolds tubing. The Raleigh Bicycle Company of Nottingham, England was a big customer for Reynolds 531 tubing used in their racing cycle range.

Reynolds 531 has now been largely replaced in new frames by still-better steels. The latest, for race or sports frames, is Reynolds 953. Reynolds worked closely with Carpenter Speciality Alloys to develop 953. It started reaching frame builders in 2005. 953 is based on a specially developed maraging steel stainless steel alloy that can achieve a tensile strength in excess of 2000 MPa (853 is around 1400 MPa), giving a good strength-to-weight ratio. Because of the high strength of the steel, extremely thin tube walls (down to 0.3 mm) can be used, thus reducing the weight.

Composites
A U.S. division called Reynolds Composites was created to manufacture composite components.

Tubing types

Steel

SMS - Plain gauge (0.8mm) drawn tubeset in high tensile steel. Replaced 531 plain gauge in 1980, replaced by 453.
453 - cromoly steel alloy. Reynolds produced only the 3 main tubes in this alloy and they were single butted, replaced by 500 series.
500 - A chromium-molybdenum (CrMo) steel, seamed, plain gauge tubeset of 3 main triangle tubes
500ATB - Mountain, All terrain, Off-road
500 Magnum - Same use as ATB
501 - Reynolds 501 was a chromium-molybdenum (CrMo) steel, seamed, butted 3-tubes tubeset that made its debut about 1983 and was available in two different thicknesses.
501ATB - Mountain, All terrain, Off-road
501 Magnum - Same use as ATB
501SB - Single Butted
501SL - Special lightweight (SL) tubeset
K2 - Reynolds K2 was a chromium-molybdenum (CrMo) steel similar to 501, seamed, butted tubeset, with eight laterally aligned ribs on the butt section, designed and produced exclusively for Raleigh between about 1993 and 1995
Optima - A chromium-molybdenum (CrMo) steel, seamed, butted tubeset designed and produced exclusively for Raleigh from 1995. Similar to 501 but tweaked for tig welding.
525 - Cold worked AISI-4130 (CrMo). Yield Strength/Ultimate Tensile Strength: 600/700 MPa, density 7.78 g/cm3 8 tube set
525-Triathlon - almost identical to 525, with the only differences being seat stays are 0.1mm thinner, and chainstays are 0.1mm thicker, than standard 525
520 - is the same as 525, made under license in Taiwan, to the same specs and qc standards as for 525. For proximity to manufacturing in South-East Asia. 
531 - Manganese/Molybdenum. YS/UTS: 695/803 MPa (45-52 Tsi, 100-130 ksi) (number quoted are for after (lower) and before (higher) brazing), density 7.85 g/cm3  Starting in about 1980 tubesets of different gauges were named as follows.
531ATB - Designed for Mountain, All terrain, Off-road
531Competition/531C - Competition Racing tubeset. Road racing, track, time trial and cyclo-cross. main tubes were 8/5/8 double butted
531CS - Club Sport. Double butted 531 main tubes, 501 forks and stays. 
531Magnum - Oversize, heavy gauge tubeset for use in ATB's.
531OS - Oversize tubeset
531Professional - Superseded 531SL, thinner and 150g lighter than 531Competition.
531SL - Special lightweight (SL) tubeset, comprising 531 main tubes drawn thinner than standard 531. Later named 531Pro. 
531 Speed Stream - 531SL Oval shaped aerodynamic tube. 50g heavier than 531C but 100g lighter than 531ST. 
531ST - Special Touring tubeset
531 Super Tourist - Superseded ST.
531DS Designer select tubing. Alternative 531 tubes with differing gauges and profiles were available to the specialist builder. 
631 - Seamless air-hardened. UTS: 800-900 MPa, density 7.78 g/cm3
631OS - Oversize tubeset
653 - Was a mixed tubeset with a non-heat treated 753 main triangle. Stays used 753r and fork blades were borrowed from the 531c tube set.
708 - 708 was a tube set in Reynolds' range in the 1990s. It has main tubes with special section. These were not butted, but had 8 flats running along the length of the tube. The rear stays would be 753.
725 - Heat-Treated 525; AISI4130 (CrMo), with strength placing it just above 921 and below 931;  UTS: 1080-1280 MPa, density 7.78 g/cm3
725os - Oversize version of the 725 tubeset
731OS - Oversize tubeset introduced in 1992 double butted oversized tubes with laterally aligned stiffening ribs on the but sections to maximize stiffness and torsional rigidity. Tubeset: Strength steering tube and fork  802N/mm2, top, down and seat tube 925N/mm2 and rear triangle 1315N/mm2.
753 - Heat-Treated Manganese-Molybdenum. Essentially 531 made with reduced wall thickness and heat treated to increase tensile strength. UTS: 1080-1280 MPa (70-83 Tsi, 157-186 ksi) Complete tube set of 11 tubes (Frame 8, Fork 3). 753 can only be lugged and fillet-brazed  with an alloy of 56% silver below 700 degrees Celsius and sale is restricted only to approved builders certified by Reynolds
753ATB - Mountain, All terrain, Off-road
753R - Road tubeset
753T - Thinner tube gauges for time trial framesets 
753OS - Oversize tubeset
853 - Seamless air-hardening heat-treated. UTS: 1250-1400 MPa, density 7.78 g/cm3
853OS - Oversize tubeset
921 - Cold-work stainless steel
931 - Precipitation hardening stainless steel.  Tubing introduced in 2012. Can be used with 953 to reduce overall frame costs.
953 - Maraging stainless steel. Introduced in 2005. UTS: 1750-2050 MPa, density 7.8 g/cm3

Aluminium

7005 - Al-Zn alloy. UTS: 400 MPa, density 2.78 g/cm3
6061 - Al-Si-Mg alloy. UTS: 325 MPa, density 2.70 g/cm3
X-100 - Al-Li Alloy. UTS: 550-600 MPa, density 2.65 g/cm3

Titanium

6Al-4V - Seamless ELI Grade. UTS: 900-1150 MPa, density 4.42 g/cm3
3Al-2.5V - Seamless. UTS: 810-960 MPa, density 4.48 g/cm3
CP 2 - Supplied to Raleigh during the 1990s

Magnesium

MZM Electron - Magnesium Alloy. UTS: ~300 MPa, density ~1.80 g/cm3

See also
 Columbus tubing

References

External links
Reynolds website
Reynolds Decal Archive 

Cycle manufacturers of the United Kingdom
Manufacturing companies based in Birmingham, West Midlands
Cycle parts manufacturers
Companies that have filed for Chapter 11 bankruptcy
Science and technology in the United Kingdom